Michael B. Poliakoff is an American academic and educator who serves as president of the American Council of Trustees and Alumni (ACTA), a non-profit organization with a stated mission of advancing academic quality, academic freedom, accountability, and affordability at colleges and universities in the United States.

Early life and education 
Poliakoff spent his childhood in New Jersey before enrolling at Yale University where he was on the wrestling team. He graduated magna cum laude with an undergraduate degree in classical studies in 1975. He then went on to attend the University of Oxford on a Rhodes Scholarship, where he earned Class I Honours in Literae Humaniores. He then earned his Ph.D. in classical studies from the University of Michigan.

Career 
Poliakoff began his career as an assistant professor at Wellesley College before becoming a professor at Hillsdale College, where he founded the classics department and served as its chair.

In 1992, Poliakoff left full-time teaching to work at the National Endowment for the Humanities, although he continued to serve as a visiting or adjunct faculty member at George Washington University, Georgetown University, and George Mason University over the course of his career.

Poliakoff has held numerous positions throughout his career, including Deputy Secretary for Postsecondary and Higher Education at the Pennsylvania Department of Education, Director of the Division of Education Programs at the National Endowment for the Humanities, Vice President for Academic Affairs and Research at University of Colorado System.

In 2010, Poliakoff joined the American Council of Trustees and Alumni as Vice President of Policy. In 2016, Poliakoff succeeded Anne D. Neal, becoming the organization's third president.

Awards and fellowships 
1975-1978 Rhodes Scholarship
1980-1981 Deutscher Akademischer Austauschdienst Scholarship 
1984-1985 Center for Hellenic Studies Fellowship
1985 Alexander von Humboldt Stipendium 
1991 American Philological Association Excellence in Teaching Award
1993 National Endowment for the Humanities Special Achievement Award 
1999 Reverend Jesse Anderson Award for Service to Students
1999 Pennsylvania Department of Education Distinguished Service to Education Award

Select publications

Classical studies 
1980 "Nectar, Springs, and the Sea: Critical Terminology in Pindar and Callimachus," Zeitschrift für Papyrologie und Epigraphik
1987 Combat Sports in the Ancient World: Competition, Violence, and Culture  
1989 (German translation) Kampfsport in der Antike: Wettstreit, Gewalt, und Kultur
1991 "Roll Over Aristotle: Martin Bernal and His Critics," Academic Questions
1992 "Vergil’s Heart of Darkness: Observations on a Recurring Theme," Arion

Education policy 
2014 Education or Reputation. A Look at America’s Top-Ranked Liberal Arts Colleges, with Armand Alacbay
2015 The Unkindest Cut. Shakespeare in Exile 2015, with ACTA staff
2015 The Cost of Chaos in the Curriculum, with Elizabeth Capaldi Phillips
2016 The Crisis of Civic Education, with William Gonch
2016 No U.S. History? How College History Departments Leave the United States out of the Major, with Drew Lakin and Marya Myers
2017 Campus Free Speech, Academic Freedom, and the Problem of the BDS Movement, with Joel Griffith

References 

Living people
Academics from New Jersey
Yale University alumni
University of Michigan alumni
Year of birth missing (living people)
Place of birth missing (living people)
Alumni of the University of Oxford
American Rhodes Scholars
Wellesley College faculty
Hillsdale College faculty
George Washington University faculty
Georgetown University faculty
George Mason University faculty